Sánchez may refer to:
Sánchez (surname)
Sánchez, Dominican Republic, municipality in Samaná Province, Dominican Republic
Sanchez Reservoir, in Colorado, United States
Palacio de Sánchez Dalp, a former palace in Seville, Andalusia, Spain

See also
Dirty Sanchez (disambiguation)
Sanches